Kristopher Lee "Kit" Cope (born March 17, 1977) is an American Muay Thai kickboxer and mixed martial artist who competes in the Featherweight, Lightweight, and Welterweight divisions. A four-time professional Muay Thai World Champion, Cope also fought in the K-1, Ultimate Fighting Championship and World Extreme Cagefighting promotions.

Career
Kit Cope was born on Williams Air Force Base in Williams, Arizona and later relocated to Las Vegas, Nevada. He began his fighting career as a Muay Thai kickboxer after having only one amateur bout, becoming professional, going 15-0 and winning, among other titles, the IKKC International Welterweight title, the WMTF World Welterweight title, the WMTA World Welterweight title, the ITBF World Light Welterweight title and the highly regarded IPMTO World Light Heavyweight Championship, which would later be renamed as the WPMF. Cope suffered the first loss of his career on November 22, 1999 when he was knocked out by Akeomi Nitta in the All Japan Kickboxing Federation in Tokyo, Japan. Cope was leading on the scorecards heading into the third round, but was slowing due to an onslaught of low kicks from Nitta, who scored a knockdown at the end of round three. Cope was able to beat the referee's count but Nitta switched to a high kick which left Cope unable to again beat the referee's count at the 2:21 mark of round three.

On March 17, 2000, accepting the bout on 1 week notice, Cope defeated reigning ISKA World Super Welterweight (-69.5 kg/153.2 lb) Muay Thai Champion Alex Gong by unanimous decision in a non-title bout in Las Vegas. He also fought in shoot boxing that year, losing a unanimous decision to Kenichi Ogata in Tokyo on May 21, 2000. Cope made his American K-1 debut on August 17, 2002 and stopped Heath Harris with a low kick, breaking Harris' femur in the opening round on the K-1 World Grand Prix 2002 in Las Vegas undercard.

He was featured in an episode of True Life entitled "I'm a Muay Thai Fighter", which chronicled his training and journey to Thailand where he knocked out Burmese fighter Mojo Mawadee in a bare-knuckle lethwei match at the Songkran Festival in Mae Sot on April 13, 2004. Then again in 2008 Cope was featured in another True Life episode entitled "I'm a Mixed Martial Arts Fighter" whereupon he defeated Dave Cochran in a very bloody fight that ended with Kit Cope forcing Cochran to submit to a triangle choke. Cope was cornered by UFC title contender Nate Diaz.

Having begun his mixed martial arts career in 1998, Cope debuted in the Ultimate Fighting Championship at The Ultimate Fighter 2 Finale in his hometown of Las Vegas on November 5, 2005. He was caught in an armbar at the end of round one and actually tapped out after the bell signaling the end of the round had already rung, however, and he continued in round two with his arm noticeably injured. He submitted to a rear-naked choke soon after. During the broadcast, commentator Mike Goldberg made a number of dubious and complimentary comments on Cope's Muay Thai accomplishments, calling him "the cream of the crop in Muay Thai" and "one of the best" strikers in the world.

On January 20, 2007, he fought fellow Muay Thai stylist Rob McCullough for the vacant WEC Lightweight Championship at WEC 25 and lost via submission due to an injury. Following the bout, he tested positive for the anabolic steroid Boldenone which is on the banned substances list of all the major athletic commissions and sports leagues.

He was expected to make his return to Muay Thai against Jose Palacios for the WBC Muaythai United States welterweight (-66.678 kg/147 lb) title at Lion Fight: Battle in the Desert 4 on November 19, 2011. However, he was not cleared to fight by the Nevada Athletic Commission for unknown reasons and was replaced by Malaipet Sasiprapa. The fight was rescheduled for Lion Fight: Battle in the Desert 5 on February 25, 2012 but he again withdrew.

Cope returned to K-1 ten years after his first appearance in the promotion, facing Chaz Mulkey at the K-1 World Grand Prix 2012 in Los Angeles on September 8, 2012. He injured himself while attempting a spinning kick in round two, and Mulkey was able to knock him down three time by attacking his injured leg, which caused referee Vichai "Rex" Supkitpol to stop the bout and announce Mulkey as the winner by TKO.

Personal life
Cope was once engaged to Gina Carano.

He was a contestant on a March 15, 2004 episode of Fear Factor, a reality television game show, and also featured twice on MTV's True Life in the episodes "I'm a Muay Thai Fighter" and "I'm a Mixed Martial Arts Fighter". In 2007, he was one of three hosts on Wild World of Spike, a television series featuring amateur sports footage and the hosts' attempts at recreating them.

Got married August 28, 2016 to Lacee Casas

Championships and awards

Amateur wrestling
Nevada State Wrestling
Nevada State Freestyle Wrestling Champion (Two times)

Kickboxing
International Professional Muay Thai Organization
IPMTO World Light Heavyweight Championship
International Thai Boxing Federation
ITBF World Light Welterweight Championship
World Muay Thai Association
WMTA World Welterweight Championship
World Muay Thai Federation
WMTF World Welterweight Championship
International Karate Kickboxing Council
IKKC International Welterweight Championship

Boxing record

|-
|-  bgcolor="#FFBBBB"
| 2000-11-18 || Loss ||align=left| Francisco Corrales || The Orleans || Las Vegas, Nevada, US || TKO || 3 || 2:59 || 1-1
|-
|-  bgcolor="#CCFFCC"
| 2000-07-28 || Win ||align=left| Edward Scolaro || The Orleans || Las Vegas, Nevada, US || TKO || 2 || 0:16 || 1-0
|-
|-
| colspan=9 | Legend:

Kickboxing record

|-
|-  bgcolor="#FFBBBB"
| 2012-09-08 || Loss ||align=left| Chaz Mulkey || K-1 World Grand Prix 2012 in Los Angeles || Los Angeles, California, US || TKO (right low kick) || 2 || 2:16
|-
|-  bgcolor="#CCFFCC"
| 2004-04-13 || Win ||align=left| Mojo Mawadee || 2004 Songkran Festival || Mae Sot, Thailand || KO (right cross) || 1 || 1:59
|-
|-  bgcolor="#CCFFCC"
| 2002-09-28 || Win ||align=left| Philippe Petit || || Las Vegas, Nevada, US || Decision (unanimous) || 5 || 3:00
|-
|-  bgcolor="#CCFFCC"
| 2002-08-17 || Win ||align=left| Heath Harris || K-1 World Grand Prix 2002 in Las Vegas || Las Vegas, Nevada, US || KO (low kick) || 2 || 0:55
|-
|-  bgcolor="#CCFFCC"
| 2002-03-23 || Win ||align=left| Clint Hale || Master Toddy Show || Las Vegas, Nevada, US || Decision (unanimous) || 5 || 3:00
|-
|-  bgcolor="#FFBBBB"
| 2000-05-21 || Loss ||align=left| Kenichi Ogata || WSBA: Invade 3rd Stage || Tokyo, Japan || Decision (unanimous) || 3 || 3:00
|-
|-  bgcolor="#CCFFCC"
| 2000-03-17 || Win ||align=left| Alex Gong || || Las Vegas, Nevada, US || Decision (unanimous) || 5 || 3:00
|-
|-  bgcolor="#FFBBBB"
| 1999-11-22 || Loss ||align=left| Akeomi Nitta || AJKF: WAVE-XIII || Tokyo, Japan || KO (high kick) || 3 || 2:21
|-
|-
| colspan=9 | Legend:

Mixed martial arts record 

|-
| Win
|align=center| 6–7
|Daniel Smyrk
|TKO (punches)
|Kings of Kombat 7
|
|align=center|2
|align=center|
|Keysborough, Victoria, Australia
|
|-
| Win
|align=center| 5–7
|Jeff Harrison
|Submission (armbar)
|Wreck MMA: Road to Glory
|
|align=center|1
|align=center|2:12
|Gatineau, Quebec, Canada
|
|-
|Loss
|align=center| 4–7
|Freddy Assuncao
|Submission (rear-naked choke)
|Fight Night Entertainment: Round 13 – Impact
|
|align=center|2
|align=center|3:47
|Bellingham, Washington, United States
|
|-
|Loss
|align=center| 4–6
|Corey Hill
|Submission (triangle choke)
|Raging Wolf VIII: Cage Supremacy
|
|align=center|1
|align=center|2:30
|Salamanca, New York, United States
|
|-
|Loss
|align=center| 4–5
|Cameron Dollar
|Submission (rear-naked choke)
|Ring of Fire 36
|
|align=center|1
|align=center|4:38
|Denver, Colorado, United States
|
|-
| Win
|align=center| 4–4
|Zach Skinner
|TKO (punches)
|Fight Night Events
| 
|align=center|2
|align=center|3:27
|Anaheim, California, United States
|
|-
|Win
|align=center| 3–4
|Dave Cochran
|Submission (triangle choke)
|World Fighting Championships 7: Lockdown
|
|align=center|1
|align=center|4:32
|Atlantic City, New Jersey, United States
|
|-
|Loss
|align=center| 2–4
|Rob McCullough
|Submission (injury)
|WEC 25
|
|align=center|1
|align=center|2:53
|Las Vegas, Nevada, United States
|
|-
| Loss
|align=center| 2–3
|Kenny Florian
|Submission (rear-naked choke)
|The Ultimate Fighter 2 Finale
| 
|align=center|2
|align=center|0:37
|Las Vegas, Nevada, United States
|
|-
|Win
|align=center| 2–2
|Mike Lucero
|TKO (strikes)
|Valor Fighting: Home of the Brave
|
|align=center|1
|align=center|2:50
|Susanville, California, United States
|
|-
|Win
|align=center| 1–2
|Emmett Olvera
|Submission (guillotine choke)
|Venom: First Strike
|
|align=center|1
|align=center|2:37
|Huntington Beach, California, United States
|
|-
|Loss
|align=center| 0–2
|Tiki Ghosn
|TKO (retirement)
|WFA 2: Level 2
|
|align=center|2
|align=center|5:00
|Las Vegas, Nevada, United States
|
|-
|Loss
|align=center|0–1
|William Sriyapai
|Submission (rear-naked choke)
|King of the Cage 1
|
|align=center|1
|align=center|3:18
|San Jacinto, California, United States
|

References

External links
 Official site
 Official K-1 profile
 K-1Sport profile
 
 

Living people
1977 births
Boxers from Arizona
Boxers from Nevada
Welterweight boxers
American male kickboxers
Kickboxers from Arizona
Kickboxers from Nevada
Welterweight kickboxers
Middleweight kickboxers
Light heavyweight kickboxers
American male mixed martial artists
Mixed martial artists from Arizona
Mixed martial artists from Nevada
Lightweight mixed martial artists
Welterweight mixed martial artists
Mixed martial artists utilizing Muay Thai
Mixed martial artists utilizing boxing
Mixed martial artists utilizing freestyle wrestling
Mixed martial artists utilizing Brazilian jiu-jitsu
American practitioners of Brazilian jiu-jitsu
American Muay Thai practitioners
Sportspeople from Mesa, Arizona
Sportspeople from Las Vegas
American sportspeople in doping cases
Doping cases in mixed martial arts
American male boxers
People from Williams, Arizona